Simon Preston of Craigmillar (c. 1510 – c. 1570) was Lord Provost of Edinburgh during the years 1565 to 1569 and was a member of the Privy Council of Scotland during the reign of Mary, Queen of Scots.

Political career
Simon Preston was involved in the rebuilding of Holyrood Palace in September 1554 for Mary of Guise, Regent of Scotland. He supplied lead for the roof. The palace had been damaged by an English army in 1544. Tantallon Castle came into the hands of Mary of Guise in February 1557. The Earl of Cassillis appointed Preston as the castle's keeper.

In January 1561 Queen Mary sent Simon Preston to Scotland as her envoy. He and his three colleagues were instructed to announce the death of her husband Francis II of France, and her decision to return to Scotland. They came first to Preston's own Craigmillar Castle, and met William Maitland of Lethington. The English diplomat in Edinburgh Thomas Randolph was not very pleased with this news (which did not suit his view of England's foreign policy), but wrote that Preston was the best of the "packe" of four in which "the moste hope is of Cragmellour."

Mary made Preston captain of Dunbar Castle, and in August 1565, at the time of the rebellion called the Chaseabout Raid, she made him her preferred candidate for the Provost of Edinburgh, to replace Archibald Douglas of Kilspindie, (namesake son of Greysteil). Preston was understood to be a Catholic.

On 6 October 1566 the Privy Council made Preston collector-general of a tax of £12,000 Scots to be raised to entertain the ambassadors at the baptism of Prince James.

In 1567 he was grated the building complex around Trinity College Church by the state, but two days later gifted it to the city, asking that the main ancillary building be used as a hospital for the poor.

Preston's loyalty to Mary wavered before her final battle in Scotland at Langside, and on 8 May 1568 he signed a bond with William Kirkcaldy of Grange to defend James VI of Scotland and Regent Moray against her.

Houses
Preston had two properties in Edinburgh: one in the city; one in the country, as was the norm of the day. His country residence was Craigmillar Castle, where the garden pond shaped as his initial "P" can still be seen. His city residence (demolished to build South Bridge) was known as the Black Turnpike, and stood on the corner of Hunter Square near the Tron Kirk. Mary Queen of Scots lodged here during her final days in Scotland.

Family

He married Elizabeth Menteith, and secondly Janet Beaton. Elizabeth's son David Preston was Simon's heir.

In September 1553, Regent Arran gave Preston a ring at the christening of one his children, bought from Alexander Gilbert, an Edinburgh goldsmith.

References

Politicians from Edinburgh
Scottish diplomats
16th-century Scottish people
1510s births
1570s deaths

Year of birth uncertain
Year of death uncertain
Privy Council of Mary, Queen of Scots
People of the Scottish Marian Civil War
Lord Provosts of Edinburgh